Kolmasug is a rural community located in the Worikambo electoral area in the Garu district in the Upper East region of Ghana.

Facilities 

 Kolmasug Community Health and Planning Services (CHPS)

References 

Populated places in the Upper East Region